Mineral County is a county located in the U.S. state of Montana. As of the 2020 census, the population was 4,535. Its county seat is Superior.

Geography

Major highways
  Interstate 90
  U.S. Route 10 (Former)
  Montana Highway 135

Adjacent counties

 Sanders County - north
 Missoula County - east
 Clearwater County, Idaho - southwest/Pacific Time Border
 Shoshone County, Idaho - northwest/Pacific Time Border

National protected area
 Lolo National Forest (part)

Politics
Mineral County has voted for the Republican Party candidate in all national elections since 2000. Before that, its voting was more balanced.

Demographics

2000 census
As of the 2000 United States census, there were 3,884 people, 1,584 households, and 1,067 families in the county. The population density was 3 people per square mile (1/km2). There were 1,961 housing units at an average density of 2 per square mile (1/km2). The racial makeup of the county was 94.57% White, 0.21% Black or African American, 1.93% Native American, 0.51% Asian, 0.03% Pacific Islander, 0.26% from other races, and 2.50% from two or more races. 1.57% of the population were Hispanic or Latino of any race. 22.5% were of German, 14.6% Irish, 9.9% English, 8.1% American and 8.0% Norwegian ancestry. Irish is the 5th most common language spoken at home.

There were 1,584 households, out of which 27.70% had children under the age of 18 living with them, 57.70% were married couples living together, 6.00% had a female householder with no husband present, and 32.60% were non-families. 26.60% of all households were made up of individuals, and 8.20% had someone living alone who was 65 years of age or older. The average household size was 2.41 and the average family size was 2.90.

The county population contained 24.30% under the age of 18, 6.40% from 18 to 24, 25.30% from 25 to 44, 29.80% from 45 to 64, and 14.20% who were 65 years of age or older. The median age was 41 years. For every 100 females there were 106.20 males. For every 100 females age 18 and over, there were 105.60 males.

The median income for a household in the county was $27,143, and the median income for a family was $32,096. Males had a median income of $26,782 versus $18,258 for females. The per capita income for the county was $15,166. About 12.80% of families and 15.80% of the population were below the poverty line, including 18.70% of those under age 18 and 8.50% of those age 65 or over.

2010 census
As of the 2010 United States census, there were 4,223 people, 1,911 households, and 1,229 families in the county. The racial makeup of the county was 94.9% white, 1.5% American Indian, 0.7% Asian, 0.3% black or African American, 0.2% from other races, and 2.4% from two or more races. Those of Hispanic or Latino origin made up 1.9% of the population. In terms of ancestry, 30.9% were German, 16.9% were Irish, 15.4% were English, and 3.0% were American.

Of the 1,911 households, 21.9% had children under the age of 18 living with them, 52.4% were married couples living together, 7.3% had a female householder with no husband present, 35.7% were non-families, and 29.7% of all households were made up of individuals. The average household size was 2.20 and the average family size was 2.69. The median age was 49.8 years.

The median income for a household in the county was $37,256 and the median income for a family was $44,271. Males had a median income of $35,536 versus $20,370 for females. The per capita income for the county was $19,209. About 12.7% of families and 19.0% of the population were below the poverty line, including 36.0% of those under age 18 and 4.3% of those age 65 or over.

Communities

Towns
 Alberton
 Superior (county seat)

Census-designated places
 Cyr
 De Borgia
 Haugan
 Riverbend
 Saltese
 St. Regis

Other unincorporated communities

 Borax (part of Saltese)
 Bryson
 Cabin City
 Drexel
 East Portal
 Henderson
 Keystone
 Lozeau
 Quartz
 Sohon
 Spring Gulch
 Tammany
 Tarkio
 Westfall

Former communities
 Taft

See also
 List of lakes in Mineral County, Montana
 List of mountains in Mineral County, Montana
 National Register of Historic Places listings in Mineral County, Montana

References

External links
Mineral County website

 
1914 establishments in Montana
Populated places established in 1914